A veranda or verandah is a roofed, open-air gallery or porch, attached to the outside of a building. A veranda is often partly enclosed by a railing and frequently extends across the front and sides of the structure.

Although the form verandah is correct and very common, some authorities prefer the version without an "h" (the Concise Oxford English Dictionary gives the "h" version as a variant and The Guardian Style Guide says
"veranda not verandah"). Australia's Macquarie Dictionary prefers verandah.

Architecture styles notable for verandas

Australia

The veranda has featured quite prominently in Australian vernacular architecture and first became widespread in colonial buildings during the 1850s.  The Victorian Filigree architecture style is used by residential (particularly terraced houses in Australia and New Zealand) and commercial buildings (particularly hotels) across Australia and features decorative screens of wrought iron, cast iron "lace" or wood fretwork.  The Queenslander is a style of residential construction in Queensland, Australia, which is adapted to subtropical climates and characterized in part by its large verandas, which sometimes encircle the entire house.

Brazil
The bandeirista style house from Brazil typically has a veranda positioned to face the sunrise.

Japan

In regions with heavy snowfall, especially Aomori and Niigata prefectures, structures called Gangi-Zukuri (:ja:雁木造) have been developed since the Edo period. For example, the total length of Gangi in old Takada city is over 16 Kilometers.

Poland 
In Poland, the word "weranda" is commonly used for the unheated roofed annex to a house, without walls or with glass walls.

United States
The Creole townhouse in New Orleans, Louisiana, is also noted for its prominent use of verandas. In fact, most houses constructed in the Southern United States before the advent of air conditioning were built with a covered front porch or veranda.

Spanish Colonial architecture (as well as the "Mission style" revivalist version that became popular in the Western United States in the early 1900s) commonly incorporates verandas, both on the exterior of buildings and, in cases of buildings with courtyards, along the interior walls of courtyards. In some cases, homes were constructed with every room opening into a courtyard veranda, rather than interior corridors or direct connections to other rooms.

India
Porches were a natural idea in India, a mostly warm, tropical country. In North India the porch area is called the Otala. These structures are not only used too cool off, but also as a center of social life where neighbors can talk and kids play, and as a religious center where rituals and worship of the Gods can take place. The exact origin of the structure is not yet known, but it appears to date back at least 500 years, making it a well established Indian design.  

In Southern India, the term thinnai is used, and these structures are very common. This area serves a religious purpose in addition to a social one, and is the center of everyday life for many. Konkan's architecture is influenced by nature. It is sustainable and cost effective. In Konkan traditional architecture, the veranda is called "Otti", a semi-open space with low height seating covered with a permanent roof. It serves as a transition space leading to an enclosed environment. Sometimes the sides are covered by wooden jali walls. It offers temporary resting space to house members during the afternoon and evening time.

Sri Lanka

Given its Portuguese, Dutch and British rule, many colonial Sri Lankan bungalows feature verandas. In the Sri Lankan Walauwa (a house once used by headmen under colonial rule) it is used as a space for leisure where families will spend time or read newspapers. Given the rarity of the architectural style in contemporary Sri Lanka houses with verandas are often featured in local films and dramas and symbolise a wealthy household.

Hong Kong
In Hong Kong, verandas often appear on the upper floor of the first to third generations of Tong Lau (shophouses) due to a lack of space since the 19th century.

See also

Awning
Baldresca
Canopy
Deck
Engawa
Gallery (architecture)
Lanai (architecture)
Loggia
Overhang (architecture)
Patio
Porch sitting
Shophouse
Terrace

References

External links

Archnet discussion forum on Verandah
British Empire Architecture
Glazed Victorian Verandah with 13 cast-iron fluted Gothic columns
Ajay Sinha Discovers Experimentation in Ancient Indian Temple Design
See more verandahs

Architectural elements
Hindi words and phrases